Aztlán is the mythic homeland of the Aztec people.

Aztlán may also refer to
Aztlán (Monterrey Metro), a station on the Monterrey Metro
Aztlán, an academic journal cofounded by Juan Gómez-Quiñones and published by the UCLA Chicano Studies Research Center
Aztlán, a symbol in the Chicano Movement

See also
Aztalan State Park, Wisconsin, U.S.
Aztalan, Wisconsin, a town in Wisconsin